The Casino at Marino is a small summer or pleasure house, located in Marino, Dublin, Ireland. Sometimes erroneously described as a folly, it was designed by Scottish architect William Chambers for James Caulfeild, the 1st Earl of Charlemont, starting in the late 1750s and finishing around 1775. It is a good example of Neo-Classical architecture, situated in the gardens of Marino House. Although proud of the design, Chambers was never able to visit the completed building, as he was constantly employed in England.

Name
The name 'Casino' is the diminutive form of the 18th-century Italian word 'Casa' meaning 'House', thus 'Little House', and is not used in the modern sense of "gambling establishment". After his 9-year Grand Tour of Italy and Greece, Caulfield was taken with all things Italian, and decided to add a 'little house' to his estate, which he had already named after the town of Marino in Lazio.

Context and history
The Casino is all that remains of Lord Charlemont's eighteenth-century demesne at Marino.  There had also been another ornamental building, extensive gardens and the main Marino House (which was demolished in the 1920s). Described by Charles T. Bowden in his Travel Guide of 1791 as a 'terrestrial paradise', the design of the landscape was inspired by Lord Charlemont's extensive Grand Tour.  The grounds included a lake and small streams, and at least one tunnel.  The estate was sold to the Archdiocese of Dublin under Cardinal Cullen, and later the bulk of it was sold on to the Irish Christian Brothers, with a portion (39 acres) retained for the O'Brien Institute, a school and residence for male orphans.

The tunnel at the Casino was used as a shooting range by Irish revolutionaries including Michael Collins in the 1920s.

In the 1960s, a field attached to the O'Brien Institute was given to the Sisters of Nazareth for the construction of Nazareth House, a residential home for the elderly. Archbishop John McQuaid organised the transfer of the land, and construction began on the new home months before planning permission was granted. The development was a significant encroachment on the views of the Casino.

Design
Widely regarded as one of the most important Neo-Classical building in Ireland, the Casino is actually quite small, measuring only fifty feet square to the outer columns. In plan, it takes the form of a Greek Cross with a pair of columns framing each projecting elevation.  Seen from the outside, the building has the appearance of a single roomed structure, with a large panelled door on the north elevation and a single large window on each of the other elevations. This is all illusion, however, as it actually contains 16 rooms on three floors. Only two of the panels in the door open to allow entrance, and the panes of glass in the windows are subtly curved, disguising the partitioning which allows what looks like a single window to serve several separate rooms.

Many other tricks are used throughout the construction to preserve the apparent simplicity of the design.  Four of the columns which surround the building are hollow and, with a length of chain dangling in each, allow rainwater to drain down. The Roman funerary urns on the roof (designed by James Gandon) are used as chimneys. The interior, by Simon Vierpyl, includes a basement level with a kitchen and associated rooms, a main floor with reception rooms and a top storey with servants' rooms and a State Bedroom. One of the rooms includes the Blue Salon. It includes a wooden parquet floor, with the Star of David in the centre, stucco work on the ceiling and a white marble fireplace. It contains some very fine plasterwork ceilings and some elaborate hardwood parquet floors. Originally the Casino was linked to Marino House by a tunnel, although this has been blocked off due to building works in the area.

References

Buildings and structures in Dublin (city)
Folly buildings in the Republic of Ireland
William Chambers buildings
National Monuments in County Dublin
Tourist attractions in Dublin (city)